The Greater Perth Movement describes a movement in the first two decades of the twentieth century to consolidate the town planning and urban administration of the Perth metropolitan region of Western Australia under municipal governance. The movement is most strongly associated with its chief proponent, W.E. Bold, who was influenced by ideas of municipal socialism, and saw its initial successes in the amalgamation of the local governments of Perth, North Perth and Leederville in 1914, joined by Victoria Park in 1917. Following the 1920s there was a shift away from municipal consolidation towards metropolitan planning under statutory authorities of the state government commencing with the creation of the Metropolitan Region Planning Committee in 1963.

Overview 
The movement is characterised as a period of conflict between those who sought a metropolitan municipal authority with control of key infrastructure and services, and the growth of state government control via statutory authorities.

The consolidation of the City of Perth was reversed in 1993 with the creation of three new local government authorities within the former boundaries: the City of Vincent, the Town of Cambridge and the Town of Victoria Park.

See also 

Greater Newcastle Act 1937
City of Brisbane

References 

History of Perth, Western Australia
Urban planning in Australia